Future Addict is the seventh studio album by the American guitarist Marty Friedman. The album is a collection of reworked, reconstructed and completely remade versions of songs spanning Marty's entire career, including a few songs from his Megadeth years. In addition, there are also 3 new songs on the record: "Barbie", "Tears Of An Angel" and the first single "Simple Mystery".

Track listing

Notes
Tracks 3, 6, 8 originally recorded by Megadeth (Rust in Peace, Risk, and Youthanasia respectively).
Tracks 4 and 5 originally recorded by Cacophony ("Speed Metal Symphony", 1987).
Track 7 originally recorded by Aloha (Demo, 1982) and later by Hawaii ("One Nation Underground", 1983).
Track 9 originally recorded by Marty Friedman (1st Press "Loudspeaker", 2006).
Track 10 originally recorded by Vixen (Demo, 1981) and later by Hawaii ("One Nation Underground", 1983).
Track 11 originally recorded by Deuce.

Personnel
Band members
 Marty Friedman - guitars, bass (tracks 1, 6, 8, 9, 11, 12), backing vocals (track 5)
 Jeremy Colson - vocals, drums (tracks 1-9, 11)

Session members
 Tom Harriman - Orchestration (track 12), Conductor (track 12)
 Alan Steinberger - Orchestration (track 12)
 Jeff Loomis - guitar (track 4)
 Jimmy Amason - guitars (slide) (track 8)
 Billy Sheehan - bass (tracks 3, 5, 7)
 Masaki - bass (tracks 2, 4, 10)
 Alyssa Pittaluga - voice (track 8)
 Tom Azevedo - backing vocals (track 2)
 Elizabeth Schall - backing vocals (track 4)
 Nicolas Farmakalidis - programming (additional) (track 1), programming (atmospheric) (track 7)
 Masatsugu Shinozaki - Chinese Erhu (track 12)
 Takeomi Matsuura - audio manipulation (tracks 7, 11)

Production

 Allen Isaacs - engineering, mixing, producer
 Charlie Pakkari - engineering
 Ryosuke Maekawa - engineering
 Alyssa Pittaluga - engineering (assistant)
 Mike Laza - engineering (assistant), sequencing (track 8)
 Dino Alden - mixing
 Yuji Chinone - mastering
 Marty Friedman - producer
 Hiroshi Inagaki - executive producer
 Shigetomo Sugawara - executive producer
 Takaaki Henmi - photography
 Masa Ito - liner notes (Japanese)

References

External links
 Martyfriedman.com

2008 albums
Marty Friedman albums